This is a list of lightvessels which operate or operated on various lightvessel stations in England, Scotland and Wales.

Trinity House lightvessels
The central records of the lightvessels operated by Trinity House were lost when Trinity House was bombed in 1940.

Other operators

See also

Lightvessel stations of Great Britain

References